MKB "Fakel" ("Torch") also known as P.D.Grushin Machine-building Design Bureau is a Russian government-owned aerospace defense corporation located in Khimki, Moscow Oblast, Russia.

History
MKB Fakel was founded in 1953 under the designation OKB-2 to facilitate development of guided surface-to-air missiles in response to a growing threat of US air attack on the Soviet Union and its allies. MKB Fakel developed missiles which were used in Soviet surface-to-air defense systems S-75, 9K33 Osa, S-125, S-200, S-300, and many other systems.

In July 1958 the corporation was awarded an Order of Lenin for successful development of guided missiles for the S-75 defense system.

Missiles developed by MKB Fakel were the first in the world surface-to-air guided missiles successfully employed in military action. On May 1, 1960, American high altitude reconnaissance aircraft Lockheed U-2 was shot down near Sverdlovsk by Fakel's 11D missile (S-75) while flying over Soviet territory. Overall, missiles developed by MKB "Fakel" were employed in more than 30 countries, including Cuba, China, Vietnam and destroyed more than 2,500 of enemy aircraft.

In April 1981 it was awarded an Order of the October Revolution for successful development of guided missiles for the S-300 defense system.

In 2002 the company joined the Almaz-Antey holding.

Production
The bureau has designed the following tactical and strategic surface-to-air missiles, as well as exoatmospheric anti-ballistic missile interceptors:
V-750 series missiles (for SA-2 / S-75) systems), 
5V24 (V-600), 5V27 (V-601) missiles (for SA-3 / S-125 systems),
5V21, 5V28, 5V28V missiles (for SA-5 / S-200 systems), 
5V55K, 5V55R, 5V55R / 5V55KD, 5V55U, 48N6, 48N6E2 missiles (for SA-10 and SA-20 / S-300P-series systems), 
40N6 (for the SA-21 / S-400 system), 
9M96 series (for the SA-21 / S-400 and the S-350 systems),
9M33, 9M33M1, 9M33M2, 9M33M3, 9A33BM3 missiles (for SA-8 / 9K33 Osa system),
9M330, 9M331, 9M332, 9M338 missiles (for the SA-15 / 9K330 Tor-series systems), 
51T6 (SH-11) Gorgon missile (for the A-135 ABM-system).

References

External links
  

Almaz-Antey
Defence companies of the Soviet Union
Research institutes in the Soviet Union
Guided missile manufacturers
Companies based in Moscow Oblast
Khimki
Design bureaus